The Germantown-Chestnut Hill section of Philadelphia is about 7–8 miles northwest from the center of the city. The neighborhood of Germantown is rich in historic sites and buildings from the colonial era, a few of which are open to the public.

Its namesake comes from when the village of Chestnut Hill was part of the German Township laid out by Francis Daniel Pastorius and came to include the settlements originally known as Sommerhausen and Crefeld, as well as part of Cresheim. The area generally served as a gateway between Philadelphia and the nearby farmlands. During the American Revolutionary War era (late 18th century), the area was one of many summer vacation spots due to its higher elevation, 400–500 feet (120 to 150 m) above sea level, and cooler temperatures than the historic Center City.

The area today consists of Chestnut Hill, Mount Airy, Germantown, Morton, Wister, West Oak Lane and Cedarbrook

Much of this part of Northwest Philadelphia is covered by the 8th City Council District (Currently represented by Cindy Bass) and 14th Police District.

Demographics
The demographics of Germantown-Chestnut Hil shows that the area has a population 112,147, with 48,871 males, 63,277 females and a median age of 33.

References

Geography of Philadelphia